Tracey Magee (born 1969 in Belfast) is a Northern Irish broadcaster and journalist.

Broadcasting career
Magee joined UTV in April 1997.  As well as reporting, she has also presented news bulletins and feature programmes on UTV.

Personal life
Magee and her partner opened a bistro in Belfast in 2007.

References 

Magee, Tracey
Magee, Tracey
Magee, Tracey
Magee, Tracey
Magee, Tracey
Magee, Tracey